FK Napredok Zdravje Radovo is a football club based in the village of Radovo near Strumica, North Macedonia. They were recently played in the Macedonian Third League.

History
The club was founded in 1980.

References

External links
Napredok Radovo Facebook
Club info at MacedonianFootball 
Football Federation of Macedonia 

Napredok Radovo
Association football clubs established in 1980
1980 establishments in the Socialist Republic of Macedonia
FK